Haffar (also Romanized as Ḩaffār and Haffār) is a village in Jazireh-ye Minu Rural District, Minu District, Khorramshahr County, Khuzestan Province, Iran. At the 2006 census, its population was 211, in 39 families.

References 

Populated places in Khorramshahr County